
Gmina Jemielnica, German Gemeinde Himmelwitz is a rural gmina (administrative district) in Strzelce County, Opole Voivodeship, in south-western Poland.

Since 2006 the commune, like most of the area, has been officially bilingual in German and Polish, a substantial German population remaining in the area after it was transferred to Poland after World War II.

A famous tourist sight in the area is Himmelwitz Abbey, where the German Baroque composer Johannes Nucius died in 1620.

History

The village was first mentioned as Gemelnici in a document dated 29 November 1225 from the Duchy of Opole that granted the settlement German town law. In 1280 Duke Bolko I of Opole founded the Cistercian Himmelwitz Abbey with the assistance of the monastic community of Rauden. In the year 1285 the All Saints' Church was built, which served as the parish church until 1810.

After the death of Duke Bolko I, the town passed to his youngest son Albert, the duke of Strehlitz. Like his brothers this came under the suzerainty of the Kingdom of Bohemia in 1327, becoming part of the kingdom after the signing of the Treaty of Trentschin in 1335 by the Polish King. With the death of Duke Albert, before 1375 withouts sons, the direct line of the Duchy of Strehlitz came to an end, and Himmelwitz passed to duke Bolko III. After the childless death of Duke John II in 1532, the duchy passed to the Bohemian crown and was later absorbed by the Habsburg Empire.

After the First Silesian War in 1742 Himmelwitz was ceded along with most of Silesia to Prussia. In 1750 a monastic grammar school was opened, providing local children with access to higher education. In 1810 the Prussian government secularized the monastery and dissolved its holdings. All Saints' Church, formerly the parish church, was made into the cemetery church and the former abbey's Church of the Assumption took its place as parish church.

In 1818 Himmelwitz was incorporated as part of the newly formed Landkreis (county) of Groß Strehlitz, where it remained until 1945. In 1826 the former abbey's holdings were sold to Count Andreas Maria Renard.

After World War II Silesia was annexed by Poland as decided at the Yalta Conference. Already by January 1945 it was occupied by the Red Army, and by April 21 the new Polish administration had tentatively renamed the town Imielnica. Subsequently, the commune was incorporated into the new Silesian Voivodship and renamed Jemielnica on 30 March 1947. In 1950 it was transferred to Opole Voivodship.

On 28 August 2006 German was declared an official language of the commune, and on November 14, 2008, the old German place-names were reintroduced, with bilingual signage set up.

Villages
The commune contains the villages and settlements of Jemielnica, Barut, Bokowe, Centawa, Gąsiorowice, Łaziska, Piotrówka and Wierchlesie.

Demographics
At the time of the census of 2002, the commune had 7,702 inhabitants. Of these, 4,091 (53.1%) declared the Polish nationality; 1,871 persons (24.3%) declared the German nationality; and 627 (8.1%) with the non-recognized Silesian nationality. 1,096 inhabitants (14.2%) declared no nationality.

Neighbouring gminas
Gmina Jemielnica is bordered by the gminas of Kolonowskie, Strzelce Opolskie, Wielowieś and Zawadzkie.

Notable residents

 Johannes Nucius (c. 1556–1620), German composer and abbot of Himmelwitz Abbey
 Elisabeth Kollmansberger, German singer

Twin towns – sister cities

Gmina Jemielnica is twinned with:
 Laubusch (Lauta), Germany
 Wickede, Germany

References

Jemielnica
Bilingual communes in Poland